Saša Strujić (born 8 December 1991) is a Bosnian footballer who plays as a defender for TSV Steinbach Haiger.

References

External links
 Profile at DFB.de
 Profile at kicker.de

1991 births
Living people
Footballers from Sarajevo
Bosnia and Herzegovina footballers
Bosnia and Herzegovina expatriate footballers
Bosnia and Herzegovina expatriate sportspeople in Germany
Expatriate footballers in Germany
Association football defenders
Alemannia Aachen players
TSG Neustrelitz players
VfL Wolfsburg II players
TSV Steinbach Haiger players
Regionalliga players
3. Liga players